Clyde Fortuin (born 18 August 1995) is a South African cricketer. He was part of South Africa's squad for the 2014 ICC Under-19 Cricket World Cup. He was included in the Border cricket team squad for the 2015 Africa T20 Cup. In August 2017, he was named in Bloem City Blazers' squad for the first season of the T20 Global League. However, in October 2017, Cricket South Africa initially postponed the tournament until November 2018, with it being cancelled soon after.

In September 2019, Fortuin was named in Northern Cape's squad for the 2019–20 CSA Provincial T20 Cup. In April 2021, he was named in Boland's squad, ahead of the 2021–22 cricket season in South Africa. On 4 October 2021, in the 2021–22 CSA Provincial T20 Knock-Out tournament, Fortuin scored his first century in Twenty20 cricket, with 104 not out against Warriors.

References

External links
 

1995 births
Living people
South African cricketers
Border cricketers
Cape Cobras cricketers
Eastern Province cricketers
Northern Cape cricketers
Warriors cricketers
Western Province cricketers
Cricketers from Cape Town
Wicket-keepers